Trader Horn is a 1931 American Pre-Code adventure film directed by W.S. Van Dyke and starring Harry Carey and Edwina Booth. It is the first non-documentary film shot on location in Africa. The film is based on the book of the same name by trader and adventurer Alfred Aloysius Horn and tells of adventures on safari in Africa.

The film's dialogue was written by Cyril Hume. John Thomas Neville and Dale Van Every wrote the adaption. Trader Horn was nominated for the Academy Award for Best Picture in 1931. Edwina Booth, the female lead, contracted a career-ending illness while filming in Africa, for which she later sued Metro-Goldwyn-Mayer.

Plot
The film depicts the adventures of real-life trader and adventurer Alfred Aloysius "Trader" Horn (Harry Carey), while on safari in Africa. Much of the film is fictional, including the discovery of a white blonde jungle queen, the lost daughter of a missionary (Edwina Booth). A scene based upon a genuine incident occurs in which Carey as Horn swings on a vine across a river filled with genuine crocodiles, one of which comes very close to taking his leg off.

Cast (in credits order)
 Harry Carey as Aloysius 'Trader' Horn
 Edwina Booth as Nina Trent, The White Goddess
 Duncan Renaldo as Peru
 Mutia Omoolu as Rencharo, Horn's native translator and majordomo
 Olive Golden as Edith Trent
 Bob Kortman (scenes deleted)
 Marjorie Rambeau as Edith Trent (scenes deleted)
 C. Aubrey Smith as St. Clair, a Trader (uncredited)
 Riano Tindama as Witch Doctor (uncredited)

Production
Many accidents and delays occurred during filming in Africa. Many of the crew, including the director W.S. Van Dyke, contracted malaria. An African crewman fell into a river and was eaten by a crocodile, while another was killed by a charging rhinoceros.  The rhinoceros was captured on film and the scene was used in the final print. Swarms of many insects, including locusts and tse-tse flies, were common and cast and crew were perpetually bitten or stung.

Female lead Edwina Booth became infected, probably with malaria or schistosomiasis during filming. It took six years for her to fully recover from this and other conditions she endured. She retired from acting soon after and sued Metro-Goldwyn-Mayer. The case was settled out of court. A sound crew, sent halfway through filming, were unable to produce good quality work. This resulted in most of the dialogue sequences being reshot at the MGM studios in Culver City, California. This caused rumours that the entire production had been filmed there, so most of this footage was cut from the final release. Many animal scenes were filmed in Tecate, Mexico, by a second unit to avoid the American laws on the ethical treatment of animals. For example, lions were reportedly starved to promote vicious attacks on hyenas, monkeys and deer.

Release
The film earned $1,642,000 in rentals in the United States and Canada and $1,953,000 overseas for a total of $3,595,000. Subsequent reissues added a further $596,000 bringing its total worldwide rental to $4,191,000 and a profit to $1.3 million.

Other adaptations
Metro-Goldwyn-Mayer remade the film, released in 1973. Although filmed on the MGM backlot, the 1973 remake used tinted stock footage from the 1931 film. A sexploitation parody film titled Trader Hornee was released in 1970. Trader Horn is the subject of a 2009 documentary, Trader Horn: The Journey Back featuring   Harry Carey Jr.

See also
 Harry Carey filmography
 Nudity in film

References

External links

 
 
 
 
 
 Article in Daily Herald (Utah) by film historian D. Robert Carter
 Trader Horn at Virtual History

1931 films
1931 adventure films
1930s romance films
American adventure films
American black-and-white films
American romance films
Films about animal cruelty
1930s English-language films
Films based on biographies
Films directed by W. S. Van Dyke
Films produced by Irving Thalberg
Films set in Africa
Films shot in California
Films shot in the Democratic Republic of the Congo
Films shot in Kenya
Films shot in Mexico
Films shot in Sudan
Films shot in Tanzania
Films shot in Uganda
Jungle girls
Metro-Goldwyn-Mayer films
Films with screenplays by Cyril Hume
Trader Horn
1930s American films
Films with screenplays by Richard Schayer